Hsin-an may refer to:
 Xin'an County
 Bao'an County, Guangdong